Luiz Eduardo Ramos Baptista Pereira (born 12 June 1956) is a Brazilian Army four-star General, who was the Secretary of Government for President Jair Bolsonaro, succeeding Lieutenant General Carlos Alberto dos Santos Cruz.

Military career 
He joined the military career on 8 March 1973, at the Army Cadets Preparatory School, and was declared an Infantry Officer on 14 December 1979, at the Agulhas Negras Military Academy. He was promoted to his current rank on 25 November 2017.

He was formerly a Commander of the 11th Military Region, in Brasília, and of the 1st Army Division, in Rio de Janeiro. General Ramos also acted as Force Commander of United Nations Stabilization Mission in Haiti (MINUSTAH) and was the Army's Deputy Chief of Staff.

Since 3 May 2018, he is the Southeastern Military Commander.

Political career

Ramos was appointed by Bolsonaro to replace General Santos Cruz as government secretary on 13 June 2019 after Cruz had public clashes with the radical ideological wing of the government, including Bolsonaro's son Carlos, and the writer Olavo de Carvalho. Cruz was the third cabinet member to be dismissed since Bolsonaro's inauguration, and Ramos' appointment kept the number of military men in Bolsonaro's cabinet at 8 out of 22 positions.

References

|-

|-

Brazilian generals
1956 births
Living people
Government ministers of Brazil
Recipients of the Order of Military Merit (Brazil)
United Nations military personnel
Brazilian officials of the United Nations
Chiefs of Staff of Brazil